The Tomorrica is a river in southeastern Albania. It is a left tributary of Devoll, which feeds the Adriatic Sea in southeastern Albania. The river, 42 kilometers long, originates in the Ostrovicë Mountains, on the southern slopes of Mount Mieta (Maja e Mietës, 2024 m), at 1800 meters above sea level, near the village Gjogovicë. Its catchment area is 376 km2, collecting the waters of the Tomorr Mountains in the west and the Ostrovicë in the east. Significant left tributaries are only found on the lower reaches of the river: Velica, Leshnica, Kushova and Bregas.

See also 
 List of rivers of Albania

References 

Rivers of Albania
Braided rivers in Albania